This is a list of sourdough breads. Sourdough is prepared through the fermentation of dough using naturally occurring lactobacilli and yeast. The lactic acid produced by the lactobacilli imbues it a more sour taste, as well as extending its shelf life compared to other breads. Sourdough baking has a devoted community today. Many devotees share starters and tips via the Internet, and hobbyists often proudly share their work on social media.

Sourdough breads
 

 
 
 

 
 
 
 

 
 
 

 
 Rugbrød is a very common form of rye bread from Denmark.  usually resembles a long brown extruded rectangle, no more than 12 cm high, and 30–35 cm wide, depending on the bread pan in which it is baked. The basic ingredient is rye flour which will produce a plain or "old-fashioned" bread of uniform, somewhat heavy structure, but the most popular versions today contain whole grains (cracked or chopped rye kernels) and often other seeds such as sunflower seeds, linseeds or pumpkin seeds.

Gallery

See also

 
 
 
 
 
 The Puratos Sourdough Library – the only facility in the world dedicated to housing sourdough cultures

Notes

References

External links

Sourdough breads
Lists of breads